The men's 400 metres hurdles at the 1946 European Athletics Championships was held in Oslo, Norway, at Bislett Stadion on 22 and 24 August 1946.

Medalists

Results

Final
24 August

Heats
22 August

Heat 1

Heat 2

Participation
According to an unofficial count, 10 athletes from 7 countries participated in the event.

 (1)
 (1)
 (1)
 (2)
 (2)
 (2)
 (1)

References

400 metres hurdles
400 metres hurdles at the European Athletics Championships